Tatyana Nikolayevna Khromova (Татьяна Николаевна Хромова; born ) was an Uzbekistani born Kazakhstani female weightlifter, competing in the 75 kg category and representing Kazakhstan at international competitions. 

She participated at the 2000 Summer Olympics in the 75 kg event, and at the 2004 Summer Olympics in the 75 kg event. 

She competed at world championships, at the 2010 World Weightlifting Championships.

Major results

References

External links
 

1980 births
Living people
Kazakhstani female weightlifters
Weightlifters at the 2000 Summer Olympics
Weightlifters at the 2004 Summer Olympics
Olympic weightlifters of Kazakhstan
Place of birth missing (living people)
Weightlifters at the 1998 Asian Games
Weightlifters at the 2002 Asian Games
Weightlifters at the 2010 Asian Games
Asian Games medalists in weightlifting
Asian Games silver medalists for Kazakhstan
Asian Games bronze medalists for Kazakhstan
Medalists at the 2002 Asian Games
Medalists at the 2010 Asian Games
21st-century Kazakhstani women